Shanthi Williams is an Indian film and television actress who has played supporting roles in various Tamil and Malayalam movies and serials.

Career
Williams came into the industry as a child artist at the age of 12. Williams started her acting in 1970 with the film, Vietnam Veedu.  She started doing television serials from 1999,  playing second lead and supporting roles. She is best known for her role as the traditional mother in the serial Metti Oli.

She was awarded the Best Actress in a negative role by director K. Balachander for her performance in Thendral where she played Tamizharasu's mother.

She has acted in many Tamil and Malayalam films as well as serials.

Personal life

Shanthi Williams was born at Coimbatore, Tamil Nadu to Malayali parents. She married a Malayali cameraman J. Williams in 1979. They have 4 children.

Filmography

Tamil

 Madhana Maaligai (1976)
Uyarndhavargal (1977)
General Chakravarthi (1978) -
Manthoppu Kiliye (1979) - Lakshmi
 Panam Penn Pasam (1980)
 Moodu Pani (1980) - Chandru's mother
 Nenjathai Killathe (1980) - Viji's sister-in-law Mala
 Gentleman (1993)
 Karuppu Nila (1995)
 Kizhakku Mugam (1996)
 Poove Unakkaga (1996)
 Aahaa Enna Porutham (1997) - Mangalam
 Kaadhale Nimmadhi (1998)
 Sollamale (1998)
 Suyamvaram (1999) - Pallavan's Mother
 Jodi (1999) - Kannan's mother
 Unakkaga Mattum (2000) - Mangalam
 Vaanavil (2000) - Priya's mother
 Snegithiye (2000) - College Principal
 Pennin Manathai Thottu (2000)- Mythili
 Friends (2001)- Padmini's father's friend's wife
 Dumm Dumm Dumm (2001)
 Vaanchinathan (2001)
 Aandan Adimai (2001)
 Lovely (2001) - Nivetha's Mother
 Narasimha (2001) - Vaanathi's mother
 Poovellam Un Vasam (2001)
 Alli Thanda Vaanam (2001) - Kannamma
 12B (2001) as Shakthi's Mother
 Manadhai Thirudivittai (2001) - Indhu's Mother
 Roja Kootam (2002) - Akash's Mother
 Kaiyodu Kai (2003) - Raja's mother
 Parthiban Kanavu (2003) - Parthiban's mother
 Thirumalai (2003) - Anju Mahendran's mother
 Nadhi Karaiyinile (2003)
 Punnagai Poove (2003)
 Aaytha Ezhuthu (2004) - Selvanayagam's wife
 Maanasthan (2004)
 Udhaya (2004)
 Anniyan (2005) - Susheela
 Aadum Koothu (2005) -
 Pasa Kiligal (2006) -
 Oru Ponnu Oru Paiyan (2007) -
 Ammuvagiya Naan (2007) - Gowrishankar's Mother
 Cheena Thaana 001 (2007) - Governor's wife
 Odum Meghangale (2008)
 Kannukulle (2009) - Gnanaprakasam's wife 
 Aachariyangal (2012) - Vaani
 Moondru Per Moondru Kaadhal (2013) - Gunasekhar's Mother
 Jannal Oram (2013) - Justin's mother
 Amma Ammamma (2014)
 Papanasam (2015) -  Rani's mother
 Naan Avalai Sandhitha Pothu (2019) 
 Ainthu Unarvugal (2021)

Malayalam

 Nirthashala (1972)
 Masappadi Mathupilla (1973)
 Nellu (1974)
 Mucheettukalikkaarante Makal (1975)
 Akkaldama (1975)
 Muthu (1976)
 Romeo (1976)
 Chakravarthini (1977)
 Manju Moodalmanju (1980)
 Mr. Michael (1980)
 Mahan (1992)
 Gentle Man Security (1994)
 Palunku (2006) - Mother Superior
 Yes Your Honour (2006)- Ravishankar's mother
 Bhargavacharitham Moonam Khandam (2006)- Sophia's mother
 Amirtham (2006)
 Raakilipattu (2007)- College principal
 Climax (2013) - Poonkodi's Stepmother

Television

References

External links
Shanthi Williams on IMDb

Living people
Actresses from Tamil Nadu
Actresses in Malayalam cinema
Actresses in Tamil cinema
Indian child actresses
People from Coimbatore
20th-century Indian actresses
21st-century Indian actresses
Indian television actresses
Actresses in Malayalam television
1958 births
Tamil television actresses
Actresses in Tamil television